KBCR-FM (96.9 FM, "Big Country Radio") is a radio station licensed and broadcasting to Steamboat Springs, Colorado, USA. The station broadcasts a country music format and is currently owned by Don Tlapek, through licensee Blizzard Broadcasting LLC.

History
The station went on the air as KBCR-FM in 1974. On August 17, 1981, the station changed its call sign to KSBT. It reverted to the KBCR-FM calls on May 15, 1995.

Awards and honors
In 2007, KBCR's music director, Debbie Duncan, was recognized by New Music Weekly magazine as the Country Music Director of the Year at the New Music Awards.

References

External links

BCR-FM
Country radio stations in the United States
Radio stations established in 1974
1974 establishments in Colorado